Save Our State is a political group in Southern California.

Save Our State may also refer to:

 Save Our State (Australia), a political group in New South Wales
 1994 California Proposition 187, called the "Save Our State" initiative
 Save Our State Amendment, a 2010 Oklahoma ballot initiative